Gabriel Emerson Olds is an American actor and writer. He is the son of poet Sharon Olds.

Acting career
Olds began acting at age 15 at The Public Theater in New York, in a performance of Measure for Measure in 1987. Soon after, he was cast in 14 Going on 30 (ABC, 1988), a two-part Disney Sunday Movie with an age-shifting plot, similar to Big. In 1992, Olds was hired by Dick Wolf for an episode of Law & Order called "Pride and Joy", in which Olds played an ambitious student who murders his father.

In 1993, Olds made his Broadway debut with the drama Any Given Day, a prequel to the Pulitzer Prize-winning The Subject Was Roses. Olds took time off from Yale University to perform in the show. Soon after, Olds was cast in the Penny Marshall-produced film Calendar Girl, a nostalgic take on the teen road trip. Back at Yale, Olds starred in and directed the Shakespearean drama Richard II, to positive notices. More work followed, with a supporting role in John Frankenheimer's Civil War prison camp miniseries Andersonville (TNT), and work on Party of Five (Fox), Sisters (NBC), and a well-reviewed appearance in Charmed.

Olds then went back to Broadway, co-starring in Arthur Miller's A View from the Bridge at the Roundabout Theater, which won the Tony Award for Best Revival of a Play. Olds was well received as Rodolpho, an illegal immigrant who stays with Eddie Carbone (Anthony LaPaglia, Tony-winner for this performance) and falls in love with Catherine (Brittany Murphy, in her Broadway debut).

Olds also took a supporting role opposite Billy Crudup in the track and field-themed Steve Prefontaine biopic Without Limits. In 2000, Law & Order producer Dick Wolf, who'd worked with Olds before, offered him the lead role in The WB's political drama, D.C. The actor was hired to play Mason Scott, a privileged idealist with a pragmatic roommate (Mark-Paul Gosselaar) and a flaky twin sister (Jacinda Barrett).

Olds then went on to playing a deluded actor in the independent drama Urbania (2000).  Other credits include E-Ring, Commander in Chief, Six Feet Under, CSI: Crime Scene Investigation, Law & Order: Special Victims Unit, Cold Case, Numb3rs, Medium, Franklin & Bash and Private Practice. Olds also played the role of "Ed" in the Tommy Lee Jones film The Three Burials of Melquiades Estrada (winner of two awards at the Cannes Film Festival, 2005), though his scenes were deleted.

In 2007, Olds filmed two television pilots, Conspiracy (Lifetime), and Winters (NBC).  The latter was executive produced by David Shore, creator of House.  In the same year, Olds starred in the LA stage production of the two-person play Tryst, at the Black Dahlia Theater, which got him rave reviews, 6 nominations, and 2 wins for Best Actor, from LA Weekly Theater Awards and the LADCC.

Olds did voiceover work for playing psychopath Paul Carson in Capcom's video game Dead Rising, and other characters in Uncharted 4: A Thief's End, and Dishonored: Death of the Outsider.

Olds was in NBC's The Event, and NBC's Heroes where he plays a shape-shifted version of Sylar.  Olds can be seen in the CBS dramas Criminal Minds and The Mentalist,  and in the Bruce Willis action film Surrogates, in which he plays a cyborg cop.  Olds had a recurring part on HBO's Boardwalk Empire, and has appeared on all of CBS's NCIS franchise shows, including, NCIS (TV series), NCIS: New Orleans, and NCIS: Los Angeles.  Olds played Crowley on SEAL Team (TV series), and William in Amazing Stories (2020 TV series).

Olds' indie film, Apartment 407 won best picture at the San Diego International Film Festival in 2017, and he plays a young Pat Robertson in The Eyes of Tammy Faye.

Writing career
Olds writes screenplays and freelance journalism for Condé Nast Publications and salon.com.  He has written about flying after 9/11 and plastic surgery in Los Angeles.

References

External links
 
 
 Demo Reel (acting) on YouTube
 Now Casting – Gabriel Olds Pics and Bio 
 Article for salon.com

1972 births
American male film actors
American male screenwriters
American male stage actors
Living people
Male actors from New York (state)
Yale University alumni
Screenwriters from New York (state)